Neoloricata comprises the living representatives of the polyplacophoran molluscs, but also includes several species only known from fossils.

References 

Chitons